Anton Saroka (born 5 March 1992) is a Belarusian professional football player who plays for Ostrovets.

Honours
BATE Borisov
Belarusian Cup winner: 2019–20, 2020–21

International career

International goals
Scores and results list Belarus' goal tally first.

Personal life
On 12 August 2020, during the 2020 Belarusian protests, Saroka was arrested for participating in the demonstrations. He was released on 14 August.

References

External links
 
 
 Profile at Gorodeya website

1992 births
Living people
Footballers from Minsk
Belarusian footballers
Belarus international footballers
Belarus under-21 international footballers
Association football forwards
Belarusian expatriate footballers
Expatriate footballers in Russia
Expatriate footballers in Belgium
Belarusian Premier League players
Belgian Pro League players
FC Rubin Kazan players
FC Partizan Minsk players
FC Gorodeya players
FC Dinamo Minsk players
K.S.C. Lokeren Oost-Vlaanderen players
FC BATE Borisov players
FC Neman Grodno players
FC Arsenal Dzerzhinsk players
FC Ostrovets players